David Deniz Kılınç (born 19 January 1992) is a Swiss professional footballer who plays as a midfielder for Bavois.

External links
 Career history at ASF
 
 

1992 births
Sportspeople from Lausanne
Swiss people of Turkish descent
Living people
Swiss men's footballers
Association football midfielders
FC Lausanne-Sport players
FC Le Mont players
FC Bavois players
Elazığspor footballers
Bandırmaspor footballers
Altınordu F.K. players
Balıkesirspor footballers
Swiss Challenge League players
2. Liga Interregional players
Swiss 1. Liga (football) players
Swiss Promotion League players
TFF First League players
TFF Second League players
Swiss expatriate footballers
Expatriate footballers in Turkey
Swiss expatriate sportspeople in Turkey